The Reeves House is a historic house at 321 South Wright Street in Siloam Springs, Arkansas.  It is a two-story wood-frame structure, with a side gable roof, wood clapboards and shingling, and a stone and concrete foundation.  Its front facade is dominated by a central projecting clipped-gable section, whose gable is partially finished in diamond-cut wood shingles, and which shelters a second story porch over a broader first-story porch.  Both porches have jigsawn decorative woodwork and turned posts.  The house, built in 1895, is one of the finest high-style Queen Anne Victorians in the city.

The house was listed on the National Register of Historic Places in 1995.

See also
National Register of Historic Places listings in Benton County, Arkansas

References

Houses on the National Register of Historic Places in Arkansas
Queen Anne architecture in Arkansas
Houses completed in 1895
Houses in Siloam Springs, Arkansas
National Register of Historic Places in Benton County, Arkansas